Sandra D. Jeff (born 1967 or 1968) is an American politician who served as a member of the New Mexico House of Representatives from 2009 to 2015.

Career 
Jeff's reputation for voting with Republicans earned her a primary challenge in 2012. In 2014, Conservation Voters New Mexico was successful in having Jeff removed from the Democratic primary election ballot for reelection.

On January 12, 2018, Jeff said she would register as a Libertarian and run for Secretary of State of New Mexico. On August 24, 2018, Jeff dropped out of the race, citing “unforeseen personal obligations."

Jeff was eliminated in the primaries of the 2022 Navajo Nation presidential election.

References

External links
 
 Biography at Ballotpedia
 Representative Sandra D. Jeff - (D) at New Mexico Legislature

1960s births
Living people
Democratic Party members of the New Mexico House of Representatives
New Mexico Libertarians
Women state legislators in New Mexico